The Journal of Labelled Compounds and Radiopharmaceuticals is a peer-reviewed scientific journal that was established in 1965. It is published in fourteen issues per year by John Wiley & Sons on behalf of the International Isotope Society and covers all aspects of research and development leading to and resulting in labelled compound preparation. The current editor-in-chiefs are R F Dannals and V Derdau.

Abstracting and indexing 
The Journal of Labelled Compounds and Radiopharmaceuticals is abstracted and indexed in:

According to the Journal Citation Reports, the journal has a 2020 impact factor of 1.921, ranking it 50th out of 63 journals in the category "Chemistry Medicinal", 64th out of 87 journals in the category "Chemistry Analytical", and 63rd out of 78 journals in the category "Biochemical Research Methods".

Most cited papers 
According to the Web of Science, the following three papers have been cited most frequently (>80 times):

References

External links 
 
 International Isotope Society

Chemistry journals
Wiley (publisher) academic journals
Journals published between 13 and 25 times per year